Donald Bayley (9 October 1931 – 5 May 1983) was an Australian weightlifter. He competed in the men's middleweight event at the 1960 Summer Olympics.

References

External links
 

1931 births
1983 deaths
Australian male weightlifters
Olympic weightlifters of Australia
Weightlifters at the 1960 Summer Olympics
Sportsmen from Queensland
20th-century Australian people
21st-century Australian people